Edgar County is a county located in the U.S. state of Illinois. As of the 2020 United States Census, the population was 16,866. Its county seat is Paris.

History
Edgar County was formed out of Clark County in 1823. It was named for John Edgar, an Irish-born officer in the Royal Navy who resigned rather than fight against the Americans in the Revolutionary War. Edgar moved to Kaskaskia, Illinois, in 1784, becoming a miller and merchant in that town.

Geography

There is one recreational area in the county, on the north edge of Paris. Twin Lakes Park and Reservoir began in 1895 upon completion of the dam compounding the Twin Lakes Reservoir.

Climate and weather

Adjacent counties

 Vermilion County – north
 Vermillion County, Indiana – northeast
 Vigo County, Indiana – southeast
 Clark County – south
 Coles County – southwest
 Douglas County – west
 Champaign County – northwest

Transportation

Major highways

  US Route 36
  US Route 150
  Illinois Route 1
  Illinois Route 16
  Illinois Route 49
  Illinois Route 133

Rail
Three railroad lines run through the county. Two are operated by CSX Transportation and the third by the Eastern Illinois Railroad Company.

Airport
The county contains one public-use airport: Edgar County Airport (PRG), six miles (10 km) north of Paris.

Demographics

As of the 2010 United States Census, there were 18,576 people, 7,839 households, and 5,148 families residing in the county. The racial makeup of the county was 98.3% white, 0.3% black or African American, 0.2% Asian, 0.1% American Indian, 0.3% from other races, and 0.7% from two or more races. Those of Hispanic or Latino origin made up 1.0% of the population. In terms of ancestry, 23.6% were German, 15.3% were Irish, 13.0% were English, and 12.3% were American.

Of the 7,839 households, 28.5% had children under the age of 18 living with them, 50.3% were married couples living together, 10.7% had a female householder with no husband present, 34.3% were non-families, and 29.5% of all households were made up of individuals. The average household size was 2.33 and the average family size was 2.84. The median age was 43.2 years.

The median income for a household in the county was $39,904 and the median income for a family was $51,588. Males had a median income of $38,945 versus $29,951 for females. The per capita income for the county was $22,175. About 9.7% of families and 13.5% of the population were below the poverty line, including 19.2% of those under age 18 and 7.9% of those age 65 or over.

Communities

Cities
 Chrisman
 Paris (seat)

Villages

 Brocton
 Hume
 Kansas
 Metcalf
 Redmon
 Vermilion

Unincorporated communities

 Borton
 Edgar
 Isabel
 Logan
 Nevins
 Oliver
 Patton
 Raven
 Scottland
 Woodyard

Former communities

 Bell Ridge
 Bloomfield
 Catfish
 Cherry Point
 Clays Prairie
 Conlogue
 Dudley
 Ferrel
 Garland
 Grandview
 Harris
 Hildreth
 Horace
 Huffmanville
 Hughes
 Illiana
 Kentucky
 Kidley
 Logan
 Mabel
 Marley
 Mays
 McCown
 Melwood
 Mortimer
 New Athens
 Palermo
 Quaker
 Scotts
 Warrington
 West Sandford
 Wetzel

Townships

 Brouilletts Creek
 Buck
 Edgar
 Elbridge
 Embarrass
 Grandview
 Hunter
 Kansas
 Paris
 Prairie
 Ross
 Shiloh
 Stratton
 Symmes
 Young America

Notable people

 Basil Bennett, Bronze Medalist in the Hammer Throw at the 1920 Olympics
 Offa Neal, professional baseball player with the New York Giants 
 Edward Adelbert Doisy, biochemist and Nobel Prize winner
 Frank Fletcher (baseball), professional baseball player with the Philadelphia Phillies

Politics
A swing county in the first eight decades after the Civil War, Edgar County has since become powerfully Republican. It has been carried by only two Democrats since 1940 – Lyndon Johnson in 1964 by just 139 votes, and Bill Clinton in 1992 by a 41.1 percent plurality. Hillary Clinton’s 22.7 percent vote share in 2016 was by 9.3 percent the worst ever by a Democrat in the county.

See also
 National Register of Historic Places listings in Edgar County, Illinois

References
 US Census Bureau 2007 TIGER/Line Shapefiles
 US Board on Geographic Names (GNIS)
 US National Atlas

External links
 Edgar County Fact Sheet, Illinois State Archives
 Edgar County, Illinois History and Genealogy

 
Illinois counties
1823 establishments in Illinois
Populated places established in 1823